Bessy may refer to:

People
 Claude Bessy (dancer) (born 1932), French ballerina with the Paris Opera Ballet and director of its school (1972-2004)
 Claude Bessy (writer) (1945–1999), French writer, magazine editor, singer, video producer and painter
 Cyril Bessy (born 1986), French cyclist
 Frédéric Bessy (born 1972), French cyclist
 Bessy Argyraki (born 1957), Greek pop singer

Other uses
 BESSY, a synchrotron facility in Germany
 Bessy, Aube, France, a commune
 Bessy (comics), a Belgian comics series (1952-1997), and the title character, a female collie

See also 
 Bessy-sur-Cure, Yonne, France
 Bernard Frénicle de Bessy (c. 1604–1674), French mathematician
 Bessie (disambiguation)